Maria Reig i Moles (born 17 May 1951) is an Andorran entrepreneur. She is president of the Reig Capital Group

Life
Reig was born in Andorra on 17 May 1951. She is a member of a family who are important in the Andorran banking and tobacco industries. She was the only woman involved in drafting the Constitution of Andorra that was agreed in 1993. She was (2014) president of the Reig Capital Group and a director of the bank Crèdit Andorrà and Fills de Julià Reig.

References

1951 births
Living people
Andorran women in politics